D-Men was a Dutch rap formation established in 1997 under the name D-Men Squad. This was after a freestyle session they held on a basketball court in Diemen-Zuid. The original members of D-Men were rapper Lange Frans, his brother rapper Brutus and a childhood friend rapper-singer Bart Zeilstra better known as Baas B. They picked the name that sound like their home town Diemen. Many others joined in the formation, famous for its mixtapes De Straatremixes. D-Men also have their own record label named D-Men Entertainment.

Members
Besides the three founding members, many joined in the group that its heyday had the following members:
Original members
Lange Frans (rapper)
Baas B (rapper/singer)
Brutus (rapper)
Joining members
Negativ (rapper)
DJ MBA (DJ)
Yes-R (rapper)
Brace (singer)
Soesi B (rapper)
C-Ronic (rapper)

Career
In 1997, the band's original trio started at various small venues. As D-Men they released their first single in 1999, entitled "Zoveel Mensen" ("So Many People"), and they won a talent hunt that was organised by Stichting Grap ("Joke Foundation") in 2001. With the joining of new members, the name was changed to D-Men Entertainment with the inclusion of Negativ, DJ MBA, Brace, Yes-R, Soesi B and C-Ronic. D-Men regularly performed in many venues including in Amsterdam and released three mixtapes: The original De Straatremixes in 2003, followed by De Straatremixes Deel 2 and De Straatremixes Deel 2 both in 2004. Most are parodies of American urban sounds. A sequel was also planned to be titled Rollen met D-Men, but this did not materialize.

The band started breaking up with the departure of singer Brace, followed by rapper Ali B. A single "Vraag jezelf eens af" was released. Contractual disagreements intensified with rapper Yes-R who joined the label of his cousin Ali B. Soesi B, a friend from childhood to Yes-R followed suit. The last of the new members to leave was Negativ. This the formation went back to the original three members Lange Frans, Brutus and Baas B. Yes-R even made a recording to diss the original members with his recording "Je krijgt het van ons" ("You get it from us")

D-Men decided to disband. In 2008, Lange Frans and Baas B declared on Juize.FM that a follow-up release was planned entitled De Straatremixes Deel 4. Negativ was positive and expected that at least some of the other members would come back. BUt this never materialized.

D-Men was replaced by the duo Lange Frans & Baas B

D-Men Entertainment
D-Men have established their own Record label called D-Men Entertainment.

Discography

Mixtapes
2003: De Straatremixes
2004: De Straatremixes Deel 2
2004: De Straatremixes Deel 3

Singles

References

External links
D-Men at Discogs

Dutch hip hop groups